The Usambara double-collared sunbird (Cinnyris usambaricus) is a species of bird in the family Nectariniidae. It is a resident breeder in the tropical moist montane forests of southeast Kenya and northeast Tanzania.

Taxonomy
The Usambara double-collared sunbird was described as a subspecies of the eastern double-collared sunbird by the German ornithologist Hermann Grote in 1922 and given the trinomial name Cinnyris mediocris usambaricus. He description was based on specimens collected in the Usambara Mountains of Tanzania. It was promoted to species status based on differences in plumage and genetics. The species is monotypic.

References

Usambara double-collared sunbird
Usambara double-collared sunbird
Usambara double-collared sunbird
Taxonomy articles created by Polbot